Uerzhar (ٷرجار اۋدانى) is a district of Abai Region in the eastern part of Kazakhstan, which borders with China. The administrative center of the district is the selo of Urzhar. Population:

References

Districts of Kazakhstan
Abai Region